Francis Walsh may refer to:

 Frank Walsh (Francis Henry Walsh, 1897–1968), Premier of South Australia
 Francis Leigh Walsh (1789–1884), Upper Canada politician
 Frank P. Walsh (Francis Patrick Walsh, 1864–1939), American lawyer
 Francis Walsh (bishop) (1901–1974), Roman Catholic bishop
 Walsh Intermediate School, or Francis Walsh Intermediate School, middle school in Connecticut

See also
 Francis Walshe (1885–1973), neurologist
 Fran Walsh (born 1959), screenwriter
 Frank Walsh (disambiguation)